These are the full results of the athletics competition at the 2013 Bolivarian Games which took place between November 26 and November 30, 2013 in Trujillo, Perú.

Men's results

100 meters

Heat 1 – 26 November – Wind: 0.3 m/s

Heat 2 – 26 November – Wind: -0.1 m/s

Final – 26 November – Wind: -0.3 m/s

200 meters

Heat 1 – 27 November – Wind: -0.5 m/s

Heat 2 – 27 November – Wind: -1.4 m/s

Final – 27 November – Wind: 0.0 m/s

400 meters

Heat 1 – 26 November

Heat 2 – 26 November

Final – 26 November

800 meters
Final – 28 November

1500 meters
Final – 26 November

5000 meters
Final – 29 November

10,000 meters
Final – 27 November

Half marathon
Final – 30 November

110 meters hurdles
Final – 26 November – Wind: -0.4 m/s

400 meters hurdles

Heat 1 – 27 November

Heat 2 – 27 November

Final – 28 November

3000 meters steeplechase
Final – 29 November

High jump
Final – 28 November

Pole vault
Final – 27 November

Long jump
Final – 29 November

Triple jump
Final – 26 November

Shot put
Final – 29 November

Discus throw
Final – 27 November

Hammer throw
Final – 28 November

Javelin throw
Final – 29 November

Decathlon
Final – 27/28 November

20 kilometers walk
Final – 27 November

50 kilometers walk
Final – 29 November

4 x 100 meters relay
Final – 28 November

4 x 400 meters relay
Final – 29 November

Women's results

100 meters

Heat 1 – 26 November – Wind: 0.1 m/s

Heat 2 – 26 November – Wind: 0.1 m/s

Final – 26 November – Wind: -1.0 m/s

200 meters

Heat 1 – 27 November – Wind: -0.7 m/s

Heat 2 – 27 November – Wind: -1.5 m/s

Final – 27 November – Wind: 0.0 m/s

400 meters

Heat 1 – 26 November

Heat 2 – 26 November

Final – 26 November

800 meters
Final – 28 November

1500 meters
Final – 26 November

5000 meters
Final – 28 November

10,000 meters
Final – 26 November

Half marathon
Final – 30 November

100 meters hurdles

Heat 1 – 26 November – Wind: 0.2 m/s

Heat 2 – 26 November – Wind: 1.0 m/s

Final – 26 November – Wind: 0.1 m/s

400 meters hurdles
Final – 28 November

3000 meters steeplechase
Final – 29 November

High jump
Final – 29 November

Pole vault
Final – 26 November

Long jump
Final – 28 November

Triple jump
Final – 27 November

Shot put
Final – 26 November

Discus throw
Final – 27 November

Hammer throw
Final – 29 November

Javelin throw
Final – 26 November

Heptathlon
Final – 28/29 November

20 kilometers walk
Final – 28 November

4 x 100 meters relay
Final – 28 November

4 x 400 meters relay
Final – 29 November

References

Bolivarian Games
2013